The Courtland School is a historic Rosenwald school at 25499 Florence Street in Courtland, Virginia.  It is a single-story clapboarded wood-frame structure, built to a standard two-teacher plan developed by the Rosenwald Fund for such buildings.  It is covered by a bracketed metal gable roof, and has modest Craftsman styling.  It was built in 1928, and served as a segregated school for area African-American students until 1963.  It was then purchased by a community group for use as a community center.

The building was listed on the National Register of Historic Places in 2016.

See also
National Register of Historic Places listings in Southampton County, Virginia

References

School buildings on the National Register of Historic Places in Virginia
Federal architecture in Virginia
Houses completed in 1815
Schools in Southampton County, Virginia
National Register of Historic Places in Southampton County, Virginia
Rosenwald schools in Virginia